John Madden Football II is a football video game released for IBM PC and compatibles in 1991. It serves as direct sequel to the original  1988 John Madden Football game released for PC and was released during the same year as John Madden Football '92 for the Sega Genesis. This edition has updates such as larger playbooks and more insight from John Madden.

Description
John Madden Football II comes with a game manual, two for the defense, and one for the offense. It does not use real NFL team or player names.

Reception
Computer Gaming World in 1992 wrote that despite a very sophisticated playbook, John Madden Football II "has produced a state-of-the-art product — assuming that the year is 1989". The reviewer stated that while players would quickly turn the sound off, "the graphics are even worse!", and criticized the inability to play an entire season and flawed defensive plays and coverage. He recommended Konami's NFL over Madden.

References

External links
 

Madden NFL
1991 video games
Electronic Arts games
DOS games
DOS-only games
EA Sports games
Video games developed in the United States